"Undecided" is a song by Sid Robins and Charlie Shavers and published in 1938.

Undecided may also refer to:

 "Undecided" (Chris Brown song), 2019
 "Undecided" (Masters Apprentices song), 1966  
 "Undecided", a song by Silverchair from Frogstomp, 1995
 The Undecided, a Canadian Christian pop punk band
Undecided Records, an American independent record label

See also
 Undecided voter
 Unaffiliated (disambiguation)
 Neutral (disambiguation)
 Uncertainty
 Undecidable (disambiguation)